Pulaski County is a county in the U.S. Commonwealth of Kentucky. As of the 2020 census, the population was 65,034. Its county seat is Somerset. The county was founded in December 1798 from land given by Lincoln and Green Counties and named for Polish patriot Count Casimir Pulaski. Pulaski County comprises the Somerset, KY Micropolitan Statistical Area. Somerset's population is just over 11,000, but the Micropolitan Area for Somerset/Pulaski County is over 65,000.

History
In the early 2010s, after Lake Cumberland's water level rose to its normal level after its drastic fall (which caused a drought in Pulaski County's economy) and Somerset and Burnside went "wet", Pulaski County's economy began to grow exponentially due to tourism, mainly from Ohio. Downtown Burnside had become a ghost town during Lake Cumberland's decline, and has not fully recovered, although a few new businesses are popping up. Before the lake's decline, the Seven Gables Motel was a prominent motel in south central Kentucky.

Pulaski County is a "moist" county as defined by The Kentucky Department of Alcoholic Beverage Control. The County features two "Small Farm Wineries" that sell wine to the public. The City of Somerset voted on June 26, 2012, to go fully "wet", which means alcoholic beverages can be purchased by the package and restaurants and bars can serve them by the drink. On October 15, 2013, the City of Burnside voted to go fully "wet" by a count of 123–39. All other areas of Pulaski County are "Dry".

Geography
It is the third-largest county by area in Kentucky.

Adjacent counties
 Lincoln County (north)
 Rockcastle County (northeast)
 Laurel County (east)
 McCreary County (southeast)
 Wayne County (southwest)
 Russell County (west/CST Border)
 Casey County (northwest)

Demographics

As of the census of 2000, there were 56,217 people, 22,719 households, and 16,334 families residing in the county. The racial makeup of the county was 97.48% White, 1.07% Black or African American, 0.22% Native American, 0.37% Asian, 0.02% Pacific Islander, 0.17% from other races, and 0.67% from two or more races.  0.81% of the population were Hispanic or Latino of any race.

There were 22,719 households, out of which 31.20% had children under the age of 18 living with them, 58.50% were married couples living together, 10.10% had a female householder with no husband present, and 28.10% were non-families. 24.90% of all households were made up of individuals, and 10.80% had someone living alone who was 65 years of age or older.  The average household size was 2.42 and the average family size was 2.87.

In the county, the population was spread out, with 23.40% under the age of 18, 8.00% from 18 to 24, 28.60% from 25 to 44, 24.90% from 45 to 64, and 15.10% who were 65 years of age or older.  The median age was 38 years. For every 100 females there were 95.60 males.  For every 100 females age 18 and over, there were 91.90 males.

The median income for a household in the county was $27,370, and the median income for a family was $32,350. Males had a median income of $27,398 versus $19,236 for females. The per capita income for the county was $15,352.  About 14.80% of families and 19.10% of the population were below the poverty line, including 26.90% of those under age 18 and 16.60% of those age 65 or over.

Politics
As is typical of the Unionist bloc of south-central Kentucky comprising the eastern Pennyroyal Plateau and the western part of the Eastern Coalfield, Pulaski County has been deep red Republican ever since the Civil War. The solitary Democrat to carry Pulaski County since that time has been Woodrow Wilson in 1912  and Wilson did so only when the Republican Party was deadlocked between the conservative incumbent Taft and the progressive Theodore Roosevelt Wilson took just 34.68 percent of the county's vote and won Pulaski only by 195 votes over Roosevelt and 249 over Taft.

Education

K-12
Three public school districts serve the county:
 Pulaski County School District
 The largest of the three districts, it serves the county outside the independent school districts of Somerset and Science Hill, with numerous elementary and middle schools feeding into Pulaski County High School and Southwestern Pulaski County High School.
 Somerset Independent School District
 Serves the city of Somerset with an elementary school (Hopkins Elementary), a middle school (Meece Middle) and a high school (Somerset High).
 Science Hill Independent School District
 Serves the city of Science Hill, with a single K-8 school. Students graduating from Science Hill can choose to attend either Pulaski County, Southwestern or Somerset High School.

There are also several private schools in the county, including Somerset Christian School.

Colleges and universities
Campbellsville University-Somerset, Noe Education Center
 is a regional center for Campbellsville University located in Campbellsville, KY. The Somerset Noe Education Center offers a variety of degree and certificate programs. CU-Somerset prides itself on being flexible and affordable for students from across the nation.

Somerset Community College is one of 16 two-year, open-admissions colleges of the Kentucky Community and Technical College System. The college offers academic, general education, and technical curricula leading to certificates, diplomas, and associate degrees. The college's Somerset Campus is located on Monticello Street in Somerset, across the street from the Center for Rural Development.

Transportation
Through Pulaski County run U.S. Highway South 27 from north to south and Highway East and West 80. Through the city limits of Somerset, Highway 27 stems into a three-lane road with u-turn and left turn options at each stoplight. Many food chains, local businesses and commerce centers are strewn along the highway, due to accessibility and consistent traffic throughout the area. Outside the Somerset city limits, the highway becomes a four-lane road until it becomes a two-lane highway through downtown Burnside just south of Somerset.

Intersecting these highways are many junctions and bypasses that have been paved in order to allow quick and easy traffic flow through the county, revolving around the circumscribed Kentucky Route 914 around the outskirts of Somerset, in which transporters can enter through or exit from the city from any direction easily. These series of roads mimic the infrastructure of larger cities such as Interstate 465 in Indianapolis, Indiana and New Circle Road in Lexington, Kentucky. Many of these roads were paved in the 2000s. Despite the grand area of the county, the accessibility from one end to the other is smooth and expedited.

Lake Cumberland Regional Airport is located in Pulaski County, on the southern end of Somerset's US 27 business district. The airport is owned by the city of Somerset and Pulaski County. It also serves the area around Lake Cumberland. It is mostly used for general aviation, and from late 2008 until February 2010, was served by one commercial airline, Locair. Currently, the $3 million federally funded passenger terminal is not in use.

The airport was renamed in 2008; it was formerly known as Somerset-Pulaski County Airport or J.T. Wilson Field.[3]

Communities

Cities

 Burnside
 Eubank
 Ferguson
 Science Hill
 Somerset (county seat)

Unincorporated places

 Acorn
 Alcalde
 Antioch
 Bandy
 Barnesburg
 Bee Lick
 Blue John
 Bronston
 Burnetta
 Cains Store
 Clarence
 Coin
 Dabney
 Delmer
 Elihu
 Estesburg
 Etna
 Faubush
 Goochtown
 Hargis
 Haynes Knob
 Ingle
 Jacksonville
 King Bee
 Mangum
 Meece
 Mount Victory
 Nancy
 Norfleet
 Norwood
 Oak Hill
 Omega
 Pointer
 Public
 Pulaski
 Ringgold
 Shafter
 Shopville
 Slate Branch
 Sloans Valley
 Squib
 Stab
 Tateville
 Valley Oak
 Welborn
 White Lilly
 Woodstock

Notable residents
 Harriette Simpson Arnow (1908–1986), author of Eastern Kentucky novels and histories. She and her husband Harold Arnow farmed near Burnside in the late 1930s and early 1940s.
 Silas Adams, (1839–1896), born in Pulaski County, lawyer and member of the United States House of Representatives
 John Sherman Cooper, (1901–1991), born in Pulaski County.  Lawyer, member Kentucky House of Representatives, Pulaski County Judge, United Nations delegate, member United States Senate, U.S. Ambassador to India and Nepal, first U.S. Ambassador to the German Democratic Republic (i.e. East Germany), member Warren Commission.
 Jack Daws, (1970–), born in Pulaski County. Conceptual artist.
 Daniel Dutton, (1959–), born in Pulaski County. Contemporary artist, musician, and story teller.
 Vermont Garrison, career United States Air Force officer and "triple ace"
 Jack I. Gregory, (1931-) is a former general in the United States Air Force and the former commander in chief of the Pacific Air Forces.
 Reggie Hanson, former NBA player for the Boston Celtics
 Free Frank McWorter, (1777–1854), enslaved resident of Pulaski country, managed a saltpeter mine so effectively that he bought freedom for himself and his family, and emigrated to Illinois.
 Rose Will Monroe, or Rosie the Riveter, (1920–1997) born in Pulaski County and moved to Michigan during World War II, where she helped build B-24s and B-29s for the war effort.
 Edwin P. Morrow, Kentucky Governor, 1919–1923.
 Venus Ramey, Miss America, 1944
 Lloyd B. Ramsey, (1918-2016), Major General United States Army, Commander 23rd Infantry Division (United States) (1969-1970), United States Army Provost Marshal General (1970-1974)
 Hal Rogers, (born 1937), U.S. Congressman from Kentucky
 Brent Woods, (1855–1906), Sergeant, United States Army, Medal of Honor recipient.

See also
 National Register of Historic Places listings in Pulaski County, Kentucky

References

External links
 Pulaski County official website
 Somerset-Pulaski Co. Chamber of Commerce

 
Kentucky counties
Counties of Appalachia
1798 establishments in Kentucky
Populated places established in 1798